General elections were held in Surinam on 14 March 1951. The result was a victory for the National Party of Suriname, which won 13 of the 21 seats.

Results

Elected members
National Party of Suriname
Frederik Lim A Po
Paul Kolader
David Findlay
Henk van Ommeren
Johan Adolf Pengel
Rudolf Bernhard William Comvalius
Frederick James Alexander Murray
Johan Kraag
Stuart Harry Axwijk
Emanuel Ferdinand Pierau
James Alexander Mac May
Huerta Milano Celvius Bergen
Just Rens

United Hindustani Party
Jagernath Lachmon
Harry Radhakishun
Harry Francois Sewberath Misser
Soekdew Mungra
Khemradj Kanhai
Ramkisoen Dewdat Oedayrajsing Varma

Party for National Unity and Solidarity
Ashruf Karamat Ali
Iding Soemita

Changes 
 Guno Kletter succeeded Lim A Po after by-election in 1953.
 Jules Sof succeeded Murray after by-election in 1954.

References

Suriname
Elections in Suriname
1951 in Suriname
Election and referendum articles with incomplete results
March 1951 events in South America